Pimaco Two is a census-designated place (CDP) located in Pima County, Arizona, United States.  The population was 682 at the 2010 census.

Geography
Pimaco Two is located at  (31.966574, −110.466286).

Demographics

As of the 2010 census, there were 682 people living in the CDP: 339 male and 343 female. 163 were 19 years old or younger, 67 were ages 20–34, 137 were between the ages of 35 and 49, 179 were between 50 and 64, and the remaining 136 were aged 65 and above. The median age was 47.6 years.

The racial makeup of the CDP was 89.6% White, 1.8% American Indian, 1.0% Asian, 0.4% Black or African American, 6.3% Other, and 0.9% two or more races.  13.9% of the population were Hispanic or Latino of any race.

There were 280 households in the CDP, 212 family households (75.7%) and 68 non-family households (24.3%), with an average household size of 2.44. Of the family households, 167 were married couples living together, while there were 19 single fathers and 26 single mothers; the non-family households included 61 adults living alone: 29 male and 32 female.

The CDP contained 313 housing units, of which 280 were occupied and 33 were vacant.

As of July 2016, the average home value in Pimaco Two was $357,799. The average household income was $64,268, with a per capita income of $25,318.

References

Populated places in Pima County, Arizona
Census-designated places in Pima County, Arizona